The 2020 Men's Tour Down Under was a road cycling stage race that took place between 21 and 26 January 2020 in and around Adelaide, South Australia. It was the 22nd edition of the Tour Down Under and the first race of the 2020 UCI World Tour.

Teams
All nineteen UCI WorldTeams were invited automatically and obliged to enter a team of up to seven riders into the race. Along with an Australian national team, there are twenty teams in the race. Of the 140 riders that started the race, 132 riders finished.

UCI WorldTeams

 
 
 
 
 
 
 
 
 
 
 
 
 
 
 
 
 
 
 

National Teams

 UniSA–Australia

Route

Stages

Stage 1
21 January 2020 — Tanunda to Tanunda,

Stage 2
22 January 2020 — Woodside to Stirling,

Stage 3
23 January 2020 — Unley to Paracombe,

Stage 4
24 January 2020 — Norwood to Murray Bridge,

Stage 5
25 January 2020 — Glenelg to Victor Harbor,

Stage 6
26 January 2020 — McLaren Vale to Willunga Hill,

Classification leadership table

Classification standings

General classification

Sprints classification

Mountains classification

Young rider classification

Teams classification

References

External links

2020
2020 UCI World Tour
2020 in Australian sport
January 2020 sports events in Australia